A payment service provider (PSP) is a third-party company that assists businesses to accept electronic payments, such as credit cards and debit cards payments. PSPs act as intermediaries between those who make payments, i.e. consumers, and those who accept them, i.e. retailers.

Operation
PSPs establish technical connections with acquiring banks and card networks, enabling merchants to accept different payment methods without the need to partner with a particular bank. They fully manage payment processing and external network relationships, making the merchant less dependent on banking institutions.

PSP can also offer risk management services for card and bank based payments, transaction payment matching, reporting, fund remittance and fraud protection. Some PSPs provide services to process other next generation methods (payment systems) including cash payments, wallets, prepaid cards or vouchers, and even paper or e-check processing. 

PSP fees are typically charged in one of two ways: as a percentage of each transaction, or as a fixed cost per transaction. 

US-based online payment service providers are supervised by the Financial Crimes Enforcement Network (or FinCEN), a bureau of the United States Department of the Treasury that collects and analyzes information about financial transactions in order to combat money laundering, terrorist financiers, and other financial crimes. 

European payment service providers are supervised based on the European Payment Services Directive.

Types 
There are three categories of payment service providers:

 Payment institutions: enterprises holding a licence specifically for providing payment services.
 Exempt payment service providers: organisations exempt from the licence requirement under the Exemption Regulation. 
 Banks and electronic money institutions: organisations authorised to act as a payment service provider under their licences, to the extent permitted under those licences. They are excepted from the licence requirement for payment service providers.

Security
Each merchant remains responsible for his own actions and must accordingly ensure that the selected provider observes the guidelines, e.g. with regard to data protection. Compliance with PCI DSS guidelines is important. There are four levels of PCI compliance, that must be respected by the PSP. Depending on the volume of transactions as well as other details about the level of risk assessed by payment brands, the payment service provider has to follow higher standards.

The levels are following: 

 Level 1 – Over 6 million transactions annually;
 Level 2 – Between 1 and 6 million transactions annually;
 Level 3 – Between 20,000 and 1 million transactions annually;
 Level 4 – Less than 20,000 transactions annually.

Market size

There are more than 900 payment providers in the world. More than 300 offer services for Europe  and North America. The global payment service provider market is expected to reach ~ $88 Bn by 2027 from ~ $40 Bn in 2019.

See also
 Payment gateway
 E-commerce payment system
 Payments as a service
 Payment processor
 Unified Payments Interface

References